CSF may refer to:

Biology and medicine
 Cerebrospinal fluid, clear colorless bodily fluid found in the brain and spine
 Colony-stimulating factor, secreted glycoproteins
 Cancer slope factor, estimate the risk of cancer
 Classical swine fever, contagious disease of pigs
 Contrast sensitivity function, relationship of contrast threshold vs angular frequency for an observer

Military
 Central Security Forces (CSF), an Egyptian paramilitary force
 Comprehensive Soldier Fitness
 Coalition Support Fund, US military aid to countries

Education
 California Scholarship Federation
 California State University, Fullerton, a university in Southern California
 Collège de la Sainte Famille, a Jesuit school in Cairo, Egypt
 Colorado Shakespeare Festival, a Shakespeare Festival each summer at the University of Colorado at Boulder
 College of Santa Fe, a private art centric college in Santa Fe New Mexico
 Conseil scolaire francophone de la Colombie-Britannique, a public school board in British Columbia, Canada
 Christian Student Fellowship, a Christian campus ministry at the University of Kentucky in Lexington, Kentucky
 Curriculum and Standards Framework

Computing
 Connected Services Framework, a service aggregation SOA platform from Microsoft
 NIST Cybersecurity Framework

Sport
 CONMEBOL or CSF (Confederación Sudamericana de Fútbol)
 CSF CFR Timișoara, a Romanian amateur association football club
 CSF Group-Navigare, an Irish professional cycling team

Other uses
 Caesium fluoride (cesium fluoride), a chemical compound
 Capsize screening formula
 Catholic Secular Forum of Mumbai, India
 Commercial Spaceflight Federation, a non-profit trade association of businesses and organizations working to make commercial human spaceflight a reality
 Community of St. Francis. an Anglican Order of nuns
 Compagnie générale de la télégraphie sans fil, a French telecommunications company
 China Securities Finance, a Chinese quasi-central bank for brokerage firm
 Community-supported fishery
 Configuration state function
 Critical success factor
 Thomson-CSF of Thales Group